Laura Yasán (20 October 1960 – 20 June 2021) was an Argentine poet.

Career
Laura Yasán was born in Buenos Aires on 20 October 1960. Throughout her career, she organized writing workshops in penitentiary units, homes for minors, asylums, and libraries. In April 2016, she coordinated an experimental workshop on creative writing and psychodrama at the University Cultural Center of the National University of the Northeast (UNNE). In 1988 she joined the 3rd Antología Ilustrada de poesía joven, and later the poetic anthology Zapatos Rojos 2000.
Her work was partially translated into English and published in the journal Poetry Ireland Review in 2002.

In 1998, she became part of A*(punto) Prieto, a women's group dedicated to literature.

Yasán participated in various poetry festivals and literary encounters, such as the International Poetry Festival of Rosario, the 13th International Poetry Festival of Medellín, the 1st International Poetry Festival in Lima (2012), the Latin American Poetry Festival in Buenos Aires (June 2015), the 2nd Correntino Poetry Festival, and the Poetry Festival in Mendoza (2016).

With the authors , Patricia Díaz Bialet, and Juano Villafañe, she wrote the collective poem Con un tigre en la boca. Manual de los amantes in 2016.

Yasán died on 20 June 2021.

Works
 
 
 
 
 
 
 
  (compilation)

Awards
 EDUCA Singular Poetry Award (Costa Rica, 1998), for Loba negra
 Fondo Nacional de las Artes Award (Buenos Aires, 1998)
 4th City of Medellín International Poetry Award (Colombia, 2002), special mention of the jury for Cotillón para desesperados
 Casa de las Américas Prize, Cuba 2008
 First Prize in Unpublished Poetry, Municipal Prizes of the city of Buenos Aires (2011)
 Carmen Conde Award, Madrid, Spain, 2011

References

External links
  

1960 births
2021 deaths
20th-century Argentine poets
20th-century Argentine women writers
20th-century Argentine writers
21st-century Argentine poets
21st-century Argentine women writers
21st-century Argentine writers
Argentine women poets
Writers from Buenos Aires